Gunhild Margareta Olsson (born 30 January 1946) is a Swedish sprinter. She competed in the 100 m hurdles and 4 × 100 metres relay at the 1972 Summer Olympics, but failed to reach the finals. Olympic bobsledder Karin Olsson is her daughter.

References

External links
 

1946 births
Living people
Athletes (track and field) at the 1972 Summer Olympics
Swedish female sprinters
Swedish female hurdlers
Olympic athletes of Sweden
People from Söderhamn Municipality
Sportspeople from Gävleborg County